The Public Trust of New Zealand was a government-appointed corporation sole providing trustee services to those unwilling to use private services, or required by the courts or legislation to use the Public Trustee.  From 2001 Public Trust ceased to be a corporation sole, adopting a structure similar to a company as a Crown entity, and was renamed Public Trust. It administers 50,000 estates, trusts, funds and agencies.

History

Origins 1870–1873
In early New Zealand, where mortality was high, literacy low, and the population mobile, but travel and communications difficult, there were problems getting reliable volunteers to be trustees, that is to look after assets, (usually an estate where the beneficiaries are minors).

Similar problems occurred in Australia, where in 1860 George Webster, now a New Zealand member of parliament had attempted to found a state trustee in Victoria.

In 1870 when the country was less than 30 years old, a member of Parliament, Edward Cephas John Stevens, suggested a state-backed trust to colonial treasurer Julius Vogel, during a casual conversation about a case where a private trustee had embezzled money.  The pair were apparently unaware of Webster’s earlier proposal.

Vogel was a keen promoter of state involvement in business, having founded State Insurance in 1869.  He introduced the Public Trustee Bill to Parliament on 28 July 1870.  The bill was passed by the house of representatives, but defeated in the legislative council, (New Zealand’s then upper house), by three votes.

In 1871 Vogel drafted an amended bill, removing two criticised aspects; the ability of the Public trustee to act under a power of attorney and the government guarantee, (both of which were soon reintroduced), and provision for closer supervision of the Public Trustee was included.  The bill was presented to the house on 23 July 1872.  Again it was heavily criticised in the upper house, where opposition was organised by Henry Sewell, who by the time of its final reading was Colonial Secretary.

Sewell described the idea as "one of the most extraordinary that ever entered in to the imagination of any persons out of the limit of those buildings which were appointed for the custody of persons not able to take care of their own property".  Ironically, the bill was then amended to place mental patient’s estates in the hands of the public trustee.

The electorate was mobilised in support of the bill, notably by Anglican and Presbyterian churches, and Sewell himself lost his position nine days after the final debate, when the Stafford government was ousted by Waterhouse. The Public Trust Act passed into law on 25 October 1872.

The first Public Trustee 1873–1880
Jonas Woodward, a 62-year-old former banker, auditor and high ranking civil servant, was appointed the first Public Trustee gazetting the functions of the office on 30 December 1872 and starting on the job on 1 January 1873.  It was initially considered a part-time job, and made up only a quarter of his salary.

During the first year the main business of the Public trustee was with intestate estates – that is, people who had died without leaving a will (234 of the 314 estates administered in 1873). This was not a matter considered by the Public Trust Act, and an amendment was introduced in September.  A further amendment on 1 November required life insurance companies to deposit security with the Public Trustee. On the same day, Woodward also acquired his first employee, having previously done all tasks in the office himself. By 1876 the office was self funding, in 1877 the second employee (an untrained cadet) joined the office. By 1878 the Public Trustee was administering 1432 estates. In that year Jonas Woodward handed over his responsibilities as Commissioner of the Government Life Insurance office and Major Charles Heaphy V.C.  Woodward retired on reaching 70 on 1 May, (although as his successor Robert Hammerton was unable to start until 8 July, he continued to work on without salary until 8 July).

A royal commission 1880–1891
Robert Hamerton, a former court registrar, expanded the office to a 12 staff by 1890, when 5,674 estates were administered.

References
Jim Anderton, "Public Trust’s Smedley Station celebrates 75 years" speech 10 March 2006, (giving Smedley Station history)
Jim Anderton, "Opening of New Greenlane public trust office", speech 6 May 2004, (refers to Public Trust being first choice as Kiwi Bank manager)
Jim Anderton, "Modernisation of Public Trust takes another step", press release 6 December 2000.
Michael R Cramp QC,  "Hutton", letter to Philips Fox dated 26 March 2001, later released to the media by David Hutton.
Crown Company Monitoring Advisory Unit "Statement of Intent", Public Trust 2006/2008  
Ian Hayes, "President Speaks out on conveyancing and the real estate industry" and "Public Trust Office conveyancing", Law talk, Newsletter of the New Zealand Law Society, 4 August 1997.
Rob Hosking "Public Trust’s free will making service is threatened", Good Returns, 22 November 2001
Mark Peck, (chair), 1999/2000 "Financial Review of the Public Trust Office", Report of the Finance and Expenditure Committee of the New Zealand House of Representatives, 2001, (Public record).
Raymond Joseph Polaschek, "Public Trust", Entry in the Encyclopedia of New Zealand, 1966.
The Press, Canterbury, "Committee questions Public Trust Office" (Newspaper article), 1 March 2003.
Television New Zealand "Committee Slates Public Trust Office", One Network News, 29 March 2001.
Public Trust "What’s Happening To Conveyancing in 1998" March 1998 Newsletter to customers.
Public Trust, Annual Reports (public record).
Ainsley Thompson, "Cut Price Conveyancing Arrangement Collapses" New Zealand Lawyer 6 September 2001
C.W. Vennell, "A Century of Trust: A History of the New Zealand Public Trust Office 1873-1973", Wilson and Horton, Auckland, 1973
Michael Winteringham, "Public Trustee and Chief Executive of Public Trust" media statement 27 September 2001

External links

 

Law of New Zealand
New Zealand crown entity companies